Breach was a Swedish post-hardcore band formed in Luleå in 1993. The band, which included a large line-up near the end of their lifetime as a group, is noted for combining various elements of hardcore with metal music. They issued 4 full-lengths through Burning Heart Records and a slew of EPs through a variety of labels before officially breaking up in 2002. Since their split, the group has performed one reunion show in 2007.

History 
The band was formed in Luleå in 1993, and released their first full-length album in 1995. Pelle Gunnerfeldt from Fireside recorded and mixed several of the group's albums. Shortly after the release of Kollapse the band announced that they had decided to split up. Vocalist Tomas Hallbom explained that while there were many factors into the group's break-up, the primary reason for their split was caused by the lack of agreements made within the band's expansive seven-member line-up. The band played a reunion show in Stockholm on 6 December 2007 and ended the show by destroying all their instruments, leading fans to speculate that this would be the band's final show.

Musical style 
Breach started as a metal influenced hardcore band. The band's later style features a mixture of hardcore, crust punk, post-hardcore, post rock and black/thrash metal. They combine fast metallic parts with clean, atmospheric guitar lines. Their production is a lot rawer and harsher than that of most modern post-hardcore bands. Critic Steve Huey compared the band's sound to the "difficult-to-classify hardcore/metal hybrids on the Victory Records label." Stephen Hill of Louder Sound described the band's style as "Unsane or Prong with more expansive flourishes" as well as name their 2000 album Venom as an underrated release within the European hardcore scene. Kollapse was named "a masterpiece in the violent birth of post-metal" on pinpointmusic.com.

Band members 
Final line-up
Tomas Hallbom (Vocals)
Anders Ekström (Guitar)
Niklas Quintana (Guitar)
Johan Gustafsson (Bass)
Tomas Turunen (Drums)
Per Nordmark (Drums)

Former members
Magnus Höggren (Bass)
Kalle Nyman (Bass)
Jejo Perkovic (Drums)
Janne Westerberg (Drums)
Erik Carlsson (Guitar)
Kristian Andersson (Bass)

Discography 
Studio albums
Friction (27 October 1995, Burning Heart)
It's Me God (28 April 1997, Burning Heart)
Venom (17 May 1999, Burning Heart)
Kollapse (3 December 2001, Burning Heart)

Singles and EPs
Outlines CDEP (1 June 1994, Burning Heart)
Untitled 7" (1996, Chapel Hill)
Old Songs vs. New Beats CDEP (1 June 1996, Burning Heart)
6-Song Split CD split CDEP with Regression (17 April 1997, Burning Heart/Good Life)
Amen/Last Rites 7" (1 January 1999, Trust No One)
Godbox 12"/CDEP (2002, Chrome Saint Mangus)

References

External links 
Burningheart Breach page
  Relapse Records Breach Page 
Interview with Niklas Quintana after the last show

Post-hardcore groups
Musical groups established in 1993
Musical groups disestablished in 2002
Musical groups reestablished in 2007
Musical groups disestablished in 2007
Swedish heavy metal musical groups
Burning Heart Records artists
Relapse Records artists
1993 establishments in Sweden
Good Life Recordings artists